Logroñés may refer to five clubs based in Logroño, Spain:
CD Logroñés, Spanish football club founded in 1940 and not entering any competition since 2009
AD Fundación Logroñés, Spanish football club founded in 1999 and dissolved in 2009
Logroñés CF, Spanish football club founded in 2000 and dissolved in 2008
UD Logroñés, Spanish football club founded in 2009
SD Logroñés, Spanish football club founded in 2009